Fenghuang Village, also known as Ling Xia or Fenghuang Ancient Village, is a historic urban village in Fuyong, Bao'an, Shenzhen, China.

The village was founded by the descendants Wen Tianxiang, a scholar-general in the Southern Song Dynasty in the Yuan Dynasty. There are currently more than 60 Ming and Qing Dynasty buildings and structures remaining in the village, including the 6-storey Wen Tower, which was constructed in the late 18th century. The village was listed in Shenzhen's Heritage List in 2006 and restored in 2014.

See also
 Dapeng Fortress
 Nantou
 Fenghuangshan Forest Park, a mountain nearby

References

Bao'an District
Villages in China
Tourist attractions in Shenzhen